Ladies Special is an Indian television series that airs on Sony Entertainment Television. It premiered on 25 May 2009 along with a host of other new TV shows, as part of a major revamp by Sony TV. The show is about the lives of a group of ladies who travel by the Ladies Special suburban railway train in Mumbai. Season 1 went off air on 14 December 2009. Season 2 premiered on 27 November 2018 with new story and a new cast, Season 2 ended on 16 August 2019.

Series overview

Plot

Season 1 
The story is set in Mumbai and is a take on the lives and challenges faced by women in big cities and how they sometimes find hope, encouragement and companionship in the most unlikely places. In this case, the protagonists are four women – Shubha Joshi, Nanda Shinde, Bubbly Chaddha, and Pooja Singh – who travel to work and back by the Ladies Special train,

Season 2 
Three passengers, Meghna, Prarthana and Bindu meet in a Mumbai Ladies Special train and become friends, sharing their problems with each other. 
Meghna Nikade is a Marathi woman, with a positive, never-give-up attitude. Her family consists of her husband, Mandar and two kids Swapna, Sachin and father-in-law. She belongs to a lower-middle-class family. She wishes to run a garment company, Swapna Garments, with her best friend, Jyoti.

Prarthana Kashyap is a stolid Bihari 30 year old and hardworking woman who works in a telecom company. Her family consists of her mother Rachna, her father, who is unemployed and a brother, Puneet, a cab driver. Although she is short tempered, she is soft natured and is kind hearted. She is married to Viraj Parimal.

Bindu Desai is a beautiful, vivacious and a Gujarati housewife. Her husband Dr. Amar Desai is a cardiologist by profession. Amar was forced to marry Bindu, but he actually loves another woman, Dr. Kangana Rajawat. Amar confesses about Kangana to Bindu, who accepts the truth without any hesitation, much to the surprise of Amar. Though Bindu's married life is not smooth, she doesn't show her uneasiness and always carries a smile on her face. Her family consists of Mota Papa and Mota Mami.

These three friends face challenges in their marital lives, but manage to solve them. Finally Megha and Mandar have another daughter, who named after Bindu. Bindu and Amar are reunited while Kangana and Puneet are married. The serial ends with a happy note.

Cast

Season 1 
 Neena Gupta as Shubha Joshi - A married woman who realizes a dark secret about her marriage.
 Shilpa Tulaskar as Nanda Shinde - Mother of teenaged children, trying to maintain balance between work and the challenges faced by her children
 Ashita Dhawan as Bubbly Chaddha - the happy go lucky one, who smiles despite the financial hardships she faces
 Payel Sarkar as Pooja Singh - Caught in an abusive relationship. 
 Fatima Sana Shaikh as Nanda Shinde's daughter Geeti
 Sreejita De as Shivangi
 Sandeep Kulkarni as Shivam Shinde
 Akash Khurana as Vipul Joshi
 Harsh Chhaya as Karan Singh
 Satish Sharma as Mintoo Chaddha
 Sailesh Gulabani as Abhay
 Varun Badola as Vinay Josh

Season 2 
 Girija Oak as Meghna Nikade – Mandar's wife; Swapna, Sachin and Jr. Bindu's mother; Prarthana and Bindu's friend. She is an optimistic women, who makes sure that her family is happy. She lives in a lower middle class colony in Virar.
 Chhavi Pandey as Prarthana Kashyap Parimal – Rachana's daughter; Punit's sister; Viraj's wife; Meghna and Bindu's friend. She is a stolid Bihari woman and works at a telecommunication company in Khar and lives in middle class colony in Borivali.
 Bijal Joshi as Bindu Desai – Amar's wife; Meghna and Prarthana's friend. She is a cheerful Gujarati woman married to a doctor who loves another woman. She works as a mehendi artist in weddings and lives in a high-rise apartment in Goregaon.
 Vishnu Bholwani as Mandar Nikade – Meghna's husband; Swapna, Sachin and Jr. Bindu's father. He is an honest, hard working and a supportive to Meghna.
 Sahil Chaddha as Viraj Parimal – Indrajit's son; Prarthana's husband; He is a rich intern who works under Prarthana.
 Ojas Rawal as Dr. Amar Desai – Bindu's husband; Kangana's ex-fiancé; He is a heart surgeon at Jeevandeep Hospital on SV Road.
 Arvind Vaidya as Mr. Nikade – Mandar's father; Swapna, Sachin and Jr. Bindu's grandfather. He is supportive to Meghna.
 Dilip Darbar as Mota Papa – Amar's uncle. He is supportive to Bindu. 
 Jia Mustafa as Dr. Kangana Rajawat Kashyap – Amar's ex-fiancée; Puneet's wife. She is a Pediatrician at New Life Hospital. She tried to ruin Amar and Bindu's marriage, but later repents and marries Puneet. 
 Aditya Ranvijay Siddhu as Puneet Kashyap – Rachana's son; Prathana's brother; Kangana's husband. He worked as a cab driver to support his family. He married with Kangana finally. 
 Inderjeet Sagoo as Subodh – Prarthana's former love interest
 Parveen Kaur as Rachana Kashyap – Prarthana and Puneet's mother. She is a simple housewife who tries to manages everything. 
 Trishla Mehta as Swapna Nikade – Meghna and Mandar's elder daughter; Sachin and Jr. Bindu's sister.
 Archisman Pal as Sachin Nikade – Meghna and Mandar's son; Swapna and Jr. Bindu's brother.
 Neha Chandra as Jyoti Shukla – Meghna's best friend and business partner; Ram's wife. 
 Sandeep Kapoor as Ram Shukla – Jyoti's husband. He was in prison and Meghna helped him to release.

References

External links 
 Sony TV official Ladies Special website
 

Sony Entertainment Television original programming
2009 Indian television series debuts
Indian television soap operas
Television shows set in Mumbai
Television series by Optimystix Entertainment
2010s Indian television series
Television series revived after cancellation